Miss Philippines Earth 2012 was the 12th edition of the Miss Philippines Earth pageant. It was held on May 27, 2012 at the SM Mall of Asia in Pasay, Philippines. Athena Mae Imperial of Casiguran, Aurora crowned Stephany Dianne Stefanowitz of Quezon City at the end of the event. Stefanowitz represented the Philippines at the Miss Earth 2012 pageant and placed Miss Earth Air 2012.

Miss Philippines Earth is a beauty pageant in the Philippines where the participants and winners work on the environmental-social-humanitarian advocacy of the pageant. The pageant has aligned itself with the 2012 declaration of the United Nations General Assembly as the "International Year of Sustainable Energy for All" as it centers this year’s pageant edition with the promotion of sustainable energy that is accessible, cleaner, and more efficient which is essential for the achievement of sustainable development.

Aside from the Miss Philippines Earth 2012 grand title, four other titles of equal importance and with the same rank were given. Mary Candice Ramos was crowned Miss Philippines Eco Tourism 2012, Thoreen Halvorsen won Miss Philippines Fire 2012, Glennifer Perido bagged Miss Philippines Air 2012, and Samantha Purvor was crowned Miss Philippines Water 2012.

Aside from the Miss Philippines Earth 2012 grand title, four other titles of equal importance and with the same rank were given. Mary Candice Ramos was crowned Miss Philippines Eco Tourism 2012, Thoreen Halvorsen won Miss Philippines Fire 2012, Glennifer Perido bagged Miss Philippines Air 2012, and Samantha Purvor was crowned Miss Philippines Water 2012.

Results
Color keys

Notes: 
 Since 2009, the four elemental court of the Miss Philippines Earth winner, namely Miss Philippines- Air, Miss Philippines- Water, Miss Philippines- Fire, and Miss Philippines Eco-Tourism were all equal winners and the remaining five finalists who failed to advance in the top five were the runners up of the pageant.

Special awards

 Major Special Awards
 Minor/Sponsor Special Awards

Delegates
The following is the list of the 47 official delegates of Miss Philippines Earth 2012 representing various cities, municipalities, provinces, and Filipino communities abroad:

Activities
The following is the list of activities of the candidates: 

 The candidates visited a geothermal plant in Laguna, a factory of electric vehicles and other communities promoting sustainable energy as part of this year’s celebration of sustainable energy for all.
 The candidates also visited Calatagan, Nasugbu & Batangas City, Batangas, Tiaong & Catanauan, Quezon, Calapan, Oriental Mindoro and at the newly hailed New 7 Wonders of Nature, Puerto Prinsesa City, Palawan.

Judges
The following is the list of the panel of judges that selected the winners of Miss Philippines Earth 2012:

References

External links
 Miss Philippines-Earth official website

2012
2012 beauty pageants
2012 in the Philippines
May 2012 events in the Philippines